Staroitikeyevo (İśke Etekäy) is a rural locality (a village) in Batyrovsky Selsoviet, Aurgazinsky District, Bashkortostan, Russia. The population was 197 as of 2010. There are four streets.

Geography 
Staroitikeyevo is located 8 km northeast of Tolbazy (the district's administrative centre) by road. Novoitikeyevo is the nearest rural locality.

References 

Rural localities in Aurgazinsky District